The Diablerets Glacier is a glacier situated on the summit of Les Diablerets in the Bernese Alps. It covers an area of approximatively 1 km2.

The Diablerets Glacier is often confused with the nearby much larger and popular Tsanfleuron Glacier.

References 
Swiss topographic maps

Glaciers of Valais